The Prix Laure Bataillon is a French literary award established in 1986 by the cities of Nantes and Saint-Nazaire to be given for the best work of fiction translated each year. It is awarded jointly to a foreign writer and their French language translator.

History
Created in 1986 to recognise the "best work of fiction translated into French each year," the award was renamed for the Hispanic translator and literary critic, Laure Guille-Bataillon, translator of Julio Cortázar and a 1988 laureate of the prize, following her death in 1990. The International Writers and Translators Residence at Saint Nazaire has been the administrator of the prize since 1993. In 2003, another prize, the Laure-Bataillon Classic Prize (Prix Laure Bataillon Classique) — given to the translator of a deceased author or a classic work of literature — was introduced and has been awarded alongside the original Laure-Bataillon Prize since 2004. In 2017, the Prix Classique was renamed the Prix Bernard Hoepffner.

Winners of the Prix Laure-Bataillon
The past winners of the Prix Laure-Bataillon include Nobel Prize laureates, Derek Walcott, Mo Yan, and Olga Tokarczuk.

Winners of the Prix Laure-Bataillon Classique

References

Awards established in 1986
French fiction awards